Lexington Parkway station is a light rail station along the Metro Green Line in Saint Paul, Minnesota. It is located along University Avenue on both sides of the intersection with Lexington Parkway. The station has split side platforms, with the westbound platform on the north side of the tracks west of Lexington and the eastbound platform on the south side of the tracks east of the intersection.

Construction in this area began in 2012.  The station opened along with the rest of the line in 2014.

References

External links
Metro Transit: Lexington Parkway Station

Metro Green Line (Minnesota) stations in Saint Paul, Minnesota
Railway stations in the United States opened in 2014
2014 establishments in Minnesota